This is a list footballers who have played for Motherwell Football Club.

Key 
 The list is sorted by the year the player joined the club. If more than one player joined in the same year then they are sorted alphabetically.

Club years
 Counted as the years the player signed for, and left the club.

Appearances and goals

International career
 Players who made international appearances only have the highest level at which they played listed.
 A player's senior international team is sourced to National Football Teams

Players with 100 or more appearances

Players with 25–99 appearances

Players with 1–24 appearances

Sources
 
 
 Motherwellnet
Scottish Football League Internationals  Players By Club  Motherwell, London Hearts Supporters Club. Retrieved 4 February 2022
 (Scotland U23) Players Capped When Playing With Motherwell, FitbaStats. Retrieved 4 February 2022
 (Scotland U21) Players Capped When Playing With Motherwell, FitbaStats. Retrieved 4 February 2022
 (Scotland B) Players Capped When Playing With Motherwell, FitbaStats. Retrieved 4 February 2022

References

Players
 
Motherwell
Association football player non-biographical articles